Ryan Mahaffey (born November 28, 1987) is an American football coach and former fullback who is the assistant offensive line coach for the Green Bay Packers of the National Football League (NFL). He was signed by the Baltimore Ravens as an undrafted free agent in 2011 and also played for the Indianapolis Colts (2011). He played college football for the University of Northern Iowa.

External links
Green Bay Packers bio
Miami Dolphins bio
Indianapolis Colts bio

1987 births
Living people
Sportspeople from Des Moines, Iowa
Players of American football from Des Moines, Iowa
American football fullbacks
Northern Iowa Panthers football players
Indianapolis Colts players
Northern Iowa Panthers football coaches
Notre Dame Fighting Irish football coaches
Western Kentucky Hilltoppers football coaches
Green Bay Packers coaches